Tappeh Kuik (also Romanized as Tappeh Kū'īk) is a village in Hasanabad Rural District, in the Central District of Ravansar County, Kermanshah Province, Iran. At the 2006 census, its population was 246, in 56 families.

References 

Populated places in Ravansar County